Collien Ulmen (born 26 September 1981) is a German TV presenter, VJ, actress and model.

Early life 
Fernandes was born in Hamburg, Germany to a father of Goan Indian origin and a German mother. She has one younger sister, Elaine.

Aged 15, Fernandes moved out from home to begin her career as a model. Fernandes was interested in music and started singing with the band Yam Yam. She went to dance schools in Hamburg and London.

Career 
Fernandes featured in a number of music videos as background dancer for artists such as Enrique Iglesias and Dieter Bohlen's band Modern Talking. Producers took note of this, and she soon signed a record contract with BMG.

Fernandes began her TV career in 2000 presenting a number of shows and in the autumn of 2001 became the new presenter of Bravo TV on RTL2. This followed with guest appearances by The Dome and TV total. Since 2003, she has been a presenter of a number of shows on the music television channel VIVA and DSF's Maxim TV ...

In February 2004, Fernandes appeared in her first movie . That same year, she appeared in Die Nacht der Lebenden Loser. In 2007, she appeared in two more films, namely  and Morgen, ihr Luschen!, in which she embodied the leading female role. In 2007, she was nominated along with the rest of the cast from the new Sat.1 series Dr. Molly & Karl for an Adolf Grimme Award. And in 2009 she starred in the RTL show Alarm für Cobra 11 – Die Autobahnpolizei. Since the beginning of June 2009, Fernandes has been the presenter of the ProSieben show MyVideoStar.

In September 2009, Fernandes was ejected from the Internationale Funkausstellung Berlin for asking Lady Gaga during a press conference whether she had a penis or a vagina.

Modelling 
Fernandes has modelled for a number of companies, including Otto, Neckermann and BeeDees. She has also been in television advertisements for Ferrero's Kinder Bueno and Mercedes-Benz.

Fernandes was elected "Woman of the Year" in 2003 and 2006 by the readers of the German Maxim. She has also appeared in other editions of Maxim – in Russia, Spain, Ukraine and the United States. In 2010 she was elected "Sexiest Woman in the World" by the readers of the German FHM magazine.

Personal life
Fernandes met German actor Christian Ulmen in August 2010 and the couple wed on 22 June 2011. Their first child was born in April 2012.

References

External links 

 

1981 births
Living people
Actresses from Hamburg
German people of Indian descent
German television presenters
German women television presenters